Peter Clines (31 May 1969), born in Cape Neddick, Maine is an American author and novelist best known for his zombies-vs-superheroes series, Ex-Heroes, and Lovecraftian inspired Threshold novels 14 and The Fold. His short stories can be found in a variety of anthologies, including X-Files: Trust No One, edited by Jonathan Maberry. Before becoming a full-time writer, Clines worked as a props master in the film industry for 15 years.

Early life
Clines was raised in Cape Neddick, Maine, where his love of storytelling was apparent from a very young age. While in third grade, he used his handwriting practice paper to pen his first story, Lizard Men From the Center of the Earth. Clines continued telling stories as a kid, sometimes using Micronauts and Star Wars figurines to create scenes, and other times in writing. As a self-professed "comic geek", Clines created hero characters all through grade school. He submitted various comic book scripts to Marvel Comics. At age 11, he received his first professional rejection letter from Jim Shooter, the then editor-in-chief at Marvel. Clines describers it as "a very personal, very polite and professional" rejection letter. Being taken seriously as a young writer, first by Shooter and then by Marvel's Tom DeFalco, who also sent an encouraging and helpful rejection letter a few years later, encouraged Clines to continue working on his craft.

Clines graduated from University of Massachusetts, Amherst in 1991 with a degree in English Literature. As a student, he worked as a local roadie crew for traveling bands.

After a 16-month stint selling men's suits, he moved to San Diego and began working as a props master. He worked, among others, on Chairman of the Board (1998), Psycho Beach Party (2000), and Veronica Mars (2004).

Career
While Clines worked as a props master, his writing turned from props to focus on scripts.  In 2006, after the end of a film project, he dedicated himself to writing full-time. He worked for Creative Screenwriting Magazine, writing interviews, reviews, and articles. While at Creative Screenwriter, Clines interviewed, among others, George Romero, Frank Darabont, Seth Rogen, Diablo Cody, Sylvester Stallone, and the late Nora Ephron.

Clines made his first fiction sale, The Hatbox, to online journal The Harrow. He continued to sell zombie and Lovecraftian short stories to anthologies before he began writing his first published novel, Ex-Heroes, in 2008.

Bibliography

Threshold series

Ex-Heroes series

Standalone novels

Anthologies

References

External links 

Writer on Writing, Blogger

1969 births
Living people
People from York, Maine
Writers from Maine
American science fiction writers
American male novelists
21st-century American novelists
21st-century American male writers